The 2011 Australian Drivers' Championship was a CAMS sanctioned national motor racing title with the championship winner receiving the 2011 CAMS Gold Star award. It was the 55th Australian Drivers' Championship and the seventh to be contested with open wheel racing cars constructed in accordance with FIA Formula 3 regulations. It was also recognised as the 11th Australian Formula 3 Championship. The championship was contested over a series which was officially known as the "2011 Australian Formula 3 Drivers Championship for the CAMS Gold Star". The series began on 21 March 2011 at Winton Motor Raceway and finished on 13 November at Symmons Plains Raceway after seven rounds across five different states and territories, with three races at each round.

The championship was won by Queensland driver Chris Gilmour. Gilmour moved into the series lead when British racer and 2008 champion James Winslow missed the Morgan Park round. Winslow returned to the series at the next event. He won a total of eight races to Gilmour's six, but had given away a points lead to Gilmour he would never regain, ultimately falling eight points short of the winners total. Gilmour is the first Australian driver to win the championship since 2007 after three consecutive years of British drivers claiming the title. John Magro, also from Queensland, was the only driver of the 2007 generation cars apart from Gilmour to contest the full series and was rewarded with third place in the championship, but was 32 points behind Gilmour and achieved only one race win. Occasional racer Mat Sofi dominated the Eastern Creek round with three race wins while 2007 champion Tim Macrow won the final race of the season in his older, 2004 specification Dallara.

Four other drivers contested the full series in the older National Class cars in which they also competed for their own class award. As in the outright championship, the National Class winner was not decided until the final race of the season. However the spoiling presence of Macrow limited the number of points Ben Gersekowski could retrieve in his fight with Steel Guiliana, and the latter ultimately claimed the National Class award by seven points. Tasmanian driver Josh Burdon was over sixty points behind Guiliana with Roman Krumins a further twelve points in arrears.

Class structure
Cars competed in two classes: 
 Australian Formula 3 Championship – for automobiles constructed in accordance with the FIA Formula 3 regulations that applied in the year of manufacture between 1 January 2002 and 31 December 2007
 National Class – for automobiles constructed in accordance with the FIA Formula 3 regulations that applied in the year of manufacture between 1 January 1999 and 31 December 2004

An additional Invitation Class, for automobiles constructed in accordance with the appropriate regulations that applied in the year of manufacture, was provided for in the regulations, however no eligible cars competed during the course of the season.

Points System

Drivers of cars from all three classes were eligible to score points towards the Australian Drivers' Championship. National Class and Invitation Class drivers were also eligible to score points towards their respective class awards using the same points system as applied for the outright championship, but based on their relative finishing position within their class in each race.

Teams and drivers
The following teams and drivers contested the 2011 Australian Drivers' Championship. Entries sourced in part from:

Race calendar
The championship was contested over a seven-round series.

A long-time bastion of the Shannons Nationals Motor Racing Championships the 2011 season saw the Gold Star shift several events onto the International V8 Supercars Championship calendar, after occasional appearances at the Clipsal 500 and other major events. The series appeared on the program of V8 Supercar rounds at Winton, Symmons Plains, and, in a first for the category, Hidden Valley Raceway in the Northern Territory.

Results

Drivers' championship

Note: Race 3 at the opening round at Winton was cancelled due to heavy rain.

Note: There were no competitors in the Invitation Class at any of the seven rounds.

See also
 Australian Drivers' Championship
 Australian Formula 3

References

External links
 Official Australian Formula 3 website

Australian Drivers' Championship
Drivers' Championship
Australian Formula 3 seasons
Australia
Australian Formula 3